Pseudophilautus stictomerus (common name: orange-canthal shrub frog) is a species of frog in the family Rhacophoridae. It is endemic to Sri Lanka. It was first described by Albert Günther (as Ixalus stictomerus) based on a single individual collected by Colonel Richard Henry Beddome from 'Ceylon'.

Description
They have an elongated body with an obtusely pointed snout. The dorsum is dark brown. There is a narrow yellow stripe on mid-dorsum from tip of snout to vent. There are also bright orange stripes running along the canthal edges, edges of upper eyelids, and supratympanic folds.

Distribution and habitat
Pseudophilautus stictomerus is a low-country wetzone species from south-western Sri Lanka. They are commonly found on shrubs some 1 metre above ground. The species is potentially threatened by agro-chemical pollution and habitat loss and alteration.

References

stictomerus
Frogs of Sri Lanka
Endemic fauna of Sri Lanka
Amphibians described in 1876
Taxa named by Albert Günther
Taxonomy articles created by Polbot